Mesalina ercolinii is a species of sand-dwelling lizard in the family Lacertidae. The species is endemic to Somalia.

Etymology
The specific name, ercolinii, is in honor of Italian ichthyologist Antonio Ercolini.

Description
M. ercolinii is rather large, and is short-legged.

Reproduction
M. ercolinii is oviparous.

References

Further reading
Arnold EN, Lanza B, Poggesi M, Corti C (1998). "Notes on the anatomy and phylogenetic position of Eremias ercolinii Lanza & Poggesi 1975 (Reptilia, Lacertidae)". Tropical Zoology 1: 235–240. (Mesalina ercolinii, new combination).
Lanza B, Poggesi M (1975). "On a new Eremias from central Somalia". Monitore Zoologico Italiano, Nuova Serie Supplemento 6 (16): 305–312. (Eremias ercolinii, new species). (in English, with an abstract in Italian).

ercolinii
Lacertid lizards of Africa
Reptiles of Somalia
Endemic fauna of Somalia
Reptiles described in 1975
Taxa named by Benedetto Lanza
Taxa named by Marta Poggesi